The Knights of Columbus Building, in Downtown New Haven, Connecticut, is the headquarters of the Roman Catholic fraternal service organization, the Knights of Columbus. Also known as the Knights of Columbus Tower or The Knights' Tower, the building was designed by Kevin Roche John Dinkeloo and Associates and finished in 1969.

The Knights' Tower serves as the international headquarters for the Knights of Columbus and is home to the Supreme Council. Led by the Supreme Knight, the chief executive officer of the Knights, the building provides administrative support and leadership for more than 15,000 councils worldwide. The cylindrical towers at the corners give the structure a simple geometric form and represent the four core principles of the Order: Charity, Unity, Fraternity, and Patriotism.

The building was built at 1 Columbus Plaza next to the New Haven Coliseum (razed in 2007), which was designed by the same firm.

See also
 St. Mary's Church (New Haven, Connecticut)
 List of Knights of Columbus buildings

References

Office buildings in Connecticut
Headquarters in the United States
Skyscrapers in New Haven, Connecticut
Knights of Columbus buildings in the United States
1969 establishments in Connecticut
Roche-Dinkeloo buildings
Modernist architecture in Connecticut
Office buildings completed in 1969